"Teenage Love" is the first single released from Slick Rick's 1988 debut album, The Great Adventures of Slick Rick. It was released in November 1988 as his debut single and was produced by Slick Rick and The Bomb Squad. "Teenage Love" would prove to be a hit for Slick Rick, making it to number 16 on the Hot Black Singles chart and number 8 on the Hot Rap Singles. It wasn't as successful as the next single, "Children's Story", released the following year.

Track listing

A-side
"Teenage Love"- 4:48
"Teenage Love" (Dub)- 4:40

B-side
"Treat Her Like a Prostitute" (Album Version)- 3:54
"Treat Her Like a Prostitute" (Movie Version)- 3:34

Music video
A music video was directed in late 1988 and released in December 1988. The video features cameos by Big Daddy Kane and a then-unknown Lil' Kim.

Charts

Weekly charts

References

Songs about teenagers
1988 singles
Slick Rick songs
1988 songs
Def Jam Recordings singles
Song recordings produced by the Bomb Squad
Songs written by Slick Rick